Neefs is a Dutch-language surname meaning "nephew's" or "cousin's". It is most common in Brabant. Among variant forms are De Neef ("the cousin"), Neef (also a German name) and Neefjes. People with this surname include:

Benedict Neefs (1741–1790), Flemish Cistercian abbot
Edmond Neefs (fl. 1900), Belgian football player and sprinter
Jacob Neefs (1610–aft.1660), Flemish etcher, engraver and publisher
Lodewijck Neefs (1617–c.1649), Flemish painter of architectural church interiors
Louis Neefs (1937 - 1980), Belgian singer and presenter
Paul Neefs (1933–2009), Belgian architect and designer
Pieter Neefs the Elder (1578 - between 1656 and 1661), a Flemish architectural painter
Pieter Neefs the Younger (1620 – after 1675), a Flemish architectural painter
De Neef
Roger M.J. De Neef (born 1941), Flemish writer and poet
Sandra de Neef (born 1959), Dutch racing cyclist
Steven De Neef (born 1971), Belgian racing cyclist
Deneef
Alain Deneef (born 1960), Belgian entrepreneur
Michael Deneef (1851–1891), United States Navy sailor and Medal of Honor recipient
Neef
Ernst Neef (1908–1984), German geographer
Gerhardt Neef (1946–2010), German football goalkeeper
Manfred Max Neef (born 1932), Chilean economist 
Melanie Neef (born 1970), British sprinter
Wilhelm Neef (1916–1990),  German conductor and film composer

References

Dutch-language surnames
Surnames of Belgian origin